あっ、海だ。 / A, Umi Da (Oh, the Sea) is the fourth full-length album of the Japanese indie rock band Tsu Shi Ma Mi Re. It was released on June 17, 2009.

Track listing
"岩壁の上の一本指総長 (One Finger Boss on the Rock Wall" - 1:54
"タイムラグ (Time Lag)" - 3:07
"ブレスユー (Bless You)" - 4:24
"険悪ショッピング (Ominous Shopping Trip)" - 6:10
"山口 (Yamaguchi)" - 3:53
"まつり (Matsuri)" - 2:17
"マイクスメルくんくん (Mic Smell Kunkun)" - 4:14
"ストップ&ゴー! (Stop&Go!)" - 3:59
"いそぎんちゃくひともんちゃく (Isoginchaku Hitomonchaku)" - 5:23
"海産物 (Kaichanbbutsu)" - 4:00

2009 albums
Tsu Shi Ma Mi Re albums